Charles Harold Ward (16 September 1911 – August 2001) was a prominent English golfer of the 1940s, winner of the British Order of Merit in both 1948 and 1949, and twice finishing third in The Open Championship, in 1948 and 1951. He would add his name, at some stage, to the roll of honour of almost every leading event in British professional golf, with the exception of the Open.

Ward was born in Birmingham, England.  Like many players his age, Ward's best years were denied to him by World War II, so it was fitting that he should win the first professional event played after VE Day, the Daily Mail Victory Tournament at St Andrews. After his victory he returned late to his posting at an RAF base and as a punishment, was confined to barracks. Ward would win three events in 1948 (one of them in a tie), and gained more recognition for his 1949 season, his three wins that year including the rich Spalding and North British-Harrogate Tournaments and then the British Masters, also played that year at St Andrews.

Further victories followed in 1950 (the Daily Mail Tournament at Walton Heath, which Ward won in a playoff against Bobby Locke and Australian Ossie Pickworth) and 1951 (the Dunlop Tournament and the Lotus Tournament) before Ward's final victory on the British circuit in 1956, the British PGA Championship at Maesdu.

Ward represented Great Britain on three occasions in the Ryder Cup, in 1947, 1949 and 1951, although he only enjoyed one victory in his six matches, losing twice to Sam Snead and once to Ben Hogan.

Ward died after a short illness in August 2001, a month short of his 90th birthday.

Tournament wins
1934 Dunlop-Midland Professional Championship
1937 West of England Professional Championship
1945 Daily Mail Tournament
1947 Daily Telegraph Foursomes Tournament (with Ronnie White)
1948 Silver King Tournament (tie with Jimmy Adams), Yorkshire Evening News Tournament, R A Brand Tournament, Daily Telegraph Foursomes Tournament (with Gerald Micklem)
1949 Spalding Tournament, North British-Harrogate Tournament, Dunlop Masters
1950 Daily Mail Tournament
1951 Dunlop Tournament, International Professional Mixed Foursomes, Lotus Tournament
1956 PGA Close Championship
1965 PGA Seniors Championship

Results in major championships

Note: Ward only played in The Open Championship.

NT = No tournament
CUT = missed the half-way cut
"T" indicates a tie for a place

Team appearances
Ryder Cup (representing Great Britain): 1947, 1949, 1951
England–Ireland Professional Match (representing England): 1932 (winners)

References

English male golfers
Ryder Cup competitors for Europe
Sportspeople from Birmingham, West Midlands
1911 births
2001 deaths